Ackerville may refer to:
Ackerville, Alabama
Ackerville, Wisconsin